Dysaules himalayanus is a species of praying mantis in the genus Dysaules.

See also
List of mantis genera and species

References

Tarachodidae
Fauna of the Himalayas
Insects described in 1889